Last Fantasy is the second studio album by South Korean singer-songwriter IU. It was released and distributed on November 29, 2011 by LOEN Entertainment. The album features a total of thirteen tracks, including the lead single "You & I".

Upon its release, Last Fantasy was a huge commercial success, selling almost seven million copies of digital tracks in its first week of release. The total number of its digital sales surpassed the 10 million mark the following week. Meanwhile, the physical album has sold over 117,000 copies, making it the 15th best-selling Korean album of 2011.

The album's lead single "You & I" debuted at the top of the Gaon Singles Chart, with a massive first-week digital sales of 1,129,761 units. It stayed at the summit for two more weeks. The song also hit the pole position on the Billboard Korea K-Pop Hot 100 for five consecutive weeks, becoming IU's first Korea K-Pop Hot 100 topper and the longest running number-one song on the chart. The record was held until tied with Psy's "Gangnam Style" and later broken by Lee Seung-gi's "Return", which earned six weeks at the top spot from December 2012 to January 2013.

Background
Last Fantasy was meant to reflect the period in the IU's life where she bids farewell to her childhood and prepares to meet maturity. In this album, IU collaborated with singer-songwriters like Yoon Sang, Kim Kwang-jin, Lee Juck, Kim Hyeon-cheol, and Ra.D.

Some of the songs in the album were composed and written by IU herself, with help from artists like Lee Juck, Kim Hyeon-cheol, Yoon Sang, Yoon Jong-shin, G. Gorilla, and Corinne Bailey Rae. Her agency, LOEN Entertainment stated, "The album has been worked on for a long time, and the exclusive content included in the special limited edition will enable fans to better understand the album production process. It's a special gift from IU to those fans who have waited a long time."

On December 3, 2011, she started off her first week of promotions through SBS's The Music Trend. IU performed "A Child Searching for Stars" and the lead track "You & I". Both of the tracks showcased her youthful charm and sweet musicality, which gained a richer depth during her hiatus.

Music videos
On November 28, 2011, the music video for "You & I" was released through LOEN Entertainment's official YouTube channel one day before the album's release in stores. The music video (starring actor Lee Hyun-woo) brings out elements of fantasy and ties it together with a well-crafted story.

On February 9, 2012, her agency uploaded a music video for the song "Last Fantasy" through its official YouTube channel. The video contains footage from IU's Japanese debut showcase "IU JAPAN PREMIUM SPECIAL LIVE" held at the Bunkamura Orchard Hall on January 24. This is a special gift for her fans, as the video reveals not only footage from the showcase, but also includes clips of IU touring the cities of Japan and her everyday promotions and activities.

Track listing

Notes
 Track 2 is a cover version of the song under the same title, which was originally performed by South Korean pop duo Halo, from their first and final studio album released in 1997.
 The title of track 13 means "The Lover" in French.

Charts

Weekly charts

Monthly charts

Year-end charts

Awards and nominations

Release history

See also
 List of best-selling singles in South Korea
 List of Korea K-Pop Hot 100 number-one singles
 List of number-one albums of 2011 (South Korea)
 List of number-one hits of 2011 (South Korea)

Notes

References

2011 albums
IU (singer) albums
Korean-language albums
Kakao M albums